Six ships of the Royal Navy have been named HMS Queenborough, after the town of Queenborough in Kent. One of these ships was later transferred to the Royal Australian Navy as HMAS Queenborough.

 , a yacht built at Chatham Dockyard in 1671. She was rebuilt at Sheerness Dockyard in 1718, and was sold on 11 July 1771.
 , a sixth rate of 24 guns, launched at Sheerness Dockyard in 1694. She was rebuilt at Portsmouth Dockyard in 1709, and sold on 20 August 1719.
She was renamed Queenborugh on 5 November 1744, and sold in 1746.
 , a sixth rate of 24 guns, launched by Sparrow of Rotherhithe on 21 January 1747. She was one of five vessels lost in a cyclone off Pondicherry on 1 January 1761
 , a cutter of 12 guns serving from 1800 to 1806.
 , a Q-class destroyer launched by Swan Hunter and Wigham Richardson Ltd in 1942, and transferred to the Royal Australian Navy in 1945.

Battle honours
Eight battle honours have been awarded to ships named HMS Queenborough. These battle honours are earned by an individual ship, and inherited by subsequent ships of the name.

 Sadras 1758
 Negapatam 1758
 Porto Novo 1759
 Arctic 1942-43
 Sicily 1943
 Salerno 1943
 Mediterranean 1943
 Okinawa 1945

References

 

Royal Navy ship names